Selago luxurians is a species of plant in the family Scrophulariaceae. It is indigenous to the southern Cape region of South Africa.
It occurs from Riversdale in the west, as far east as Port Elizabeth, and as far inland as the Swartberg mountains.

References

Endemic flora of South Africa
luxurians
Least concern plants
Taxa named by Jacques Denys Choisy